Aymé Kunc (20 January 1877 – 13 February 1958) was a French composer and administrator.

Career
Born in Toulouse, Kunc won second prize alongside Maurice Ravel in the Prix de Rome competition of 1902. Until 1907 he conducted the orchestra of the Théâtre Apollo in Paris. In 1914 he became the director of the Toulouse Conservatory, in which capacity he served for thirty years until 1944. He died in Toulouse aged 81.

Beginning in 1996, the Association Aymé Kunc has promoted the composer's music, and has recorded a number of his works, including the Messe de Sainte-Cécile.

Selected works

Music for the stage
 Les Esclaves, opera (1911)
 Les Armes de Vulcain, ballet
 Les Dieux morts , ballet
 Pastorale antique, ballet

Orchestral works
 Ouverture de fête (1904-1907)
 Suite dramatique (1904-1907)
 Feuillets d'album
 Quatre Esquisses méditerranéennes (1949)
 Cloches d'Automne
 Prelude and final
 Fantaisie, for piano and orchestra (1904–07)
 Pensée musicale, for harp and orchestra (1916)
 Quatre Pièces, for flute and orchestra
 Pastorales, for violin and orchestra (1919)
 Légende, for viola and orchestra (1931)
 Poème, for cello and orchestra (1943)
 Nocturne, for horn and orchestra

Chamber music
 Sonata for Violin and Piano
 Fantaisie en forme de danse, for violin and piano
 Pastorale, for violin and piano
 Suite symphonique, for two cellos and piano
 Suite, for flute, cello and piano
 Trio, for violin, cello and piano
 Piano Quartet
 String Quartet No. 1 (1946)
 String Quartet No. 2 (1948)
 Pièces brèves, for string quartet
 Petite Suite, for wind quintet
 Wind Quintet (1954)
 Scherzetto, for wind quintet
 Asturiana, for wind quintet

Keyboard works
Piano music
 Scherzetto
 Simples chansons

Organ music
 Scherzetto
 Fantaisie symphonique

Vocal music
Cantatas
 Cantate pour le couronnement de Dante (1921)
 Hymne des ailes

Choral works (à cappella or with piano or small ensemble)
 Le Bohémien (with violin)
 Chanson pastorale (with piano)
 Deux Chants folkloriques
 Chants populaires languedociens
 Je ne veux plus chanter
 Noël de la libération
 Le Plus doux chant

Motets and sacred works
 Ave Maria I
 Ave Maria II
 Ave Maria III
 Ave verum I
 Ave verum II
 Messe de Sainte Cécile (1923)
 Psalm CXLVII

Songs with piano accompaniment
 Apaisement
 Je ne sais pas de fleur
 Printemps
 Soleil d'automne
 Le Voyage

References

External links
Official site

1877 births
1958 deaths
20th-century classical composers
French classical composers
French male composers
Musicians from Toulouse
Prix de Rome for composition